The Prior of Pluscarden (later Commendator of Pluscarden) was the head of the monastic community and lands of Pluscarden Priory, Moray, Scotland. The Priory was founded in  1230 by King Alexander II of Scotland for the Valliscaulian Order. In March 1454 it incorporated the foundering neighbouring establishment of Urquhart Priory and became a dependency of Dunfermline Abbey, whence it became Benedictine.  The following are a list of abbots and commendators:

List of priors

 Simon [I], 1239
 Andrew, x 1275
 William, 1275
 Simon [II], 1280–1286
 John Suryass, 1291
 John Wysy, 1345–1346
 Thomas, 1367–1398
 Alexander de Pluscarden, 1398–1426
 "Eugenius Macfeturis" (Eóghann mac Pheadair), 1417-1428 x 1431
 David Cran, 1427–1428
 Andrew Symson, 1428-1439
 Richard Lundy, 1435
 William de Breneth, 1436–1449
 Andrew Haig [I], 1447–1454
 John Benally, 1454–1456
 William Boyce, 1457–1476
 Andrew Haig [II], 1469–1471
 David Ruch, 1474–1475
 Thomas Foster, 1476–1479
 Gavin Dunbar, 1479
 David Boyce, 1481–1482
 Robert Harwar/Herwot/Harrower, 1487–1509
 George Learmond (or George Learmonth), 1509-1529
 Alexander Dunbar, 1529–1560
 George Dunbar, 1561
 George Seton, 1561–1569
 William Cranston, 1562

List of prior-commendators

 Alexander Seton, 1565-1587
 James Douglas, 1577–1581

See also
 Pluscarden Priory
 Prior of Urquhart

Notes

Bibliography
 Cowan, Ian B. & Easson, David E., Medieval Religious Houses: Scotland With an Appendix on the Houses in the Isle of Man, Second edition, (London, 1976), pp. 61, 84-5
 Watt, D. E. R. & Shead, N. F. (eds.), The Heads of Religious Houses in Scotland from the 12th to the 16th Centuries, The Scottish Records Society, New Series, Volume 24, (Edinburgh, 2001), pp. 178–82

Pluscarden
Pluscarden
Pluscarden